The Hanson Brothers are fictional characters in the 1977 movie Slap Shot. The characters are based on the Carlson brothers, who were actual hockey players.

The movie, which stars Paul Newman, was written by Nancy Dowd.  The story was based in part upon the experiences of her brother, Ned Dowd (who appears in the film as notorious hockey player Ogie Oglethorpe), when he played for the Johnstown Jets of the North American Hockey League (NAHL). In the film, the fictional Charlestown Chiefs of the fictional Federal League are fashioned on the Jets and the NAHL.

The Hanson Brothers provide several humorous moments in the film and are best remembered for:
 starting fights
 interrupting the coach in the locker room during pre-game speeches with overzealous shouting
 wearing extremely thick black-rimmed glasses
 childishly playing with toy cars and trucks in their hotel room, although the brothers range in age from 18 to 20

In the film, The Hansons are brought in by the front office as part of an inexpensive deal, also as enforcers for the Charlestown Chiefs during the team's 1975–76 (and final) season. They are, in order of their numbers:

 Jack Hanson (portrayed by David Hanson) – #16 Left Wing, age 19
 Steve Hanson (portrayed by Steve Carlson) – #17 Center, age 20
 Jeff Hanson (portrayed by Jeff Carlson) – #18 Right Wing, age 18

Biography

The film used many actual players from the Johnstown Jets, with filming commencing a few weeks after the Jets ended their 1975-76 season. The original plan was for the Hanson Brothers to be played by the Jets' trio of the real-life Carlson brothersJack, Steve and Jeff Carlson. However, just prior to shooting, brother Jack was called up by the Edmonton Oilers for their run in the 1976 World Hockey Association (WHA) playoffs. In his place, Jets player Dave Hanson filled the role.

While the film's 'Hanson Brothers' were based on the real Carlson Brothers, the character of "Killer Carlson" in the film (played by professional actor Jerry Houser) is based on Dave Hanson-whose real hockey nickname was "Killer" Hanson. Thus, Dave Hanson filled in for Jack Carlson as one of the fictional Hanson Brothers - while another actor played a character modeled after Dave Hanson. Jack Carlson, the man Dave "played" in the movie, was also very well known throughout his career as an enforcer, and did pick up the real hockey nickname "Killer" Carlson.

In the movie, the Hanson Brothers speak with a typical North Central American accent, owing to their hometowns, in areas where hockey is prevalent. The United States Hockey Hall of Fame is located in Eveleth, Minnesota, only a few miles from the city of  Virginia, home of the real Carlsons. The Iron League, from which the Hansons are supposedly bought, is a reference to the Iron Range, a hockey hotbed in Northern Minnesota.

Along with their time on minor professional teams like those depicted in the film, all three of the actors playing the Hanson Brothers played in the major leagues. At the end of the film, Paul Newman’s character gets a job as player-coach for a team in Minnesota for the 1976–77 season, intending to bring players from the defunct Chiefs with him; in real life, Dave Hanson, with Steve and Jack Carlson, played some games with the major league Minnesota Fighting Saints in the 1976–77 WHA season. Steve Carlson played in 225 games, in both the National Hockey League (NHL) and the WHA. Dave Hanson played in 136 games in the NHL and WHA. Jeff Carlson played 7 games in the WHA. Like their characters, both Dave Hanson and Jeff Carlson were known for a willingness to "drop the gloves". Steve Carlson did have some fights in his professional career, but was known more as a finesse player.

Jeff Carlson, Steve Carlson and Dave Hanson continue to make personal appearances as the Hanson Brothers, typically at minor league hockey games . The brothers appeared at the first Wilkes-Barre/Scranton Penguins Alumni Game in Wilkes-Barre, Pennsylvania, on April 4, 2009. The brothers played in a charity game March 23, 2013 in Kingston, Ontario, Canada for the benefit of Autism Kingston and the International Hockey Hall of Fame. They made an appearance in Johnstown, Pennsylvania on Tuesday, September 29, 2015, as they took part in the NHL & Kraft's Hockeyville USA, at the Cambria County War Memorial Arena, where all of the home game scenes in the movie were filmed. As the winner of Hockeyville USA contest, the Cambria County War Memorial Arena received $150,000 to renovate its scoreboard, lighting, and boards.

In popular culture
The Cleveland Monsters of the American Hockey League employ a trio of Hanson lookalikes known as the Mullet Brothers, who sport long black hair and black-rimmed glasses. The "brothers" shovel snow out of the net area during breaks in full uniform and pads.
Extreme Championship Wrestling characters The Dudley Brothers were based on the Hanson brothers. Two members of this stable, Bubba Ray & D-Von, would later shed the comedic elements of the gimmick and go on to become the Dudley Boyz tag team.
At the June 2011 NHL Awards, the Hanson Brothers appeared in a spoof sketch based on the television series Pawn Stars, in which they try to sell the Stanley Cup to proprietor Rick Harrison at his pawn shop.
In 2015 the Hanson Brothers were inducted into the Fictitious Athlete Hall of Fame.
In addition to the original film, Slap Shot (1977), all three actors reprised their roles as the Hanson Brothers in two sequels, Slap Shot 2 (2002) and Slap Shot 3 (2008).
A trio of hockey players all named Jim in Shoresy are based on the Hanson Brothers.

References 

https://history.vintagemnhockey.com/page/show/810797-carlson-brothers-

External links
 http://www.hansonbrothers.net/ - Official site for the Hanson Brothers

Comedy film characters
Fictional ice hockey players
Fictional characters from Minnesota
Fictional characters based on real people
Film characters introduced in 1977
Male characters in film